Nicolás Nieri (6 December 1939 – 23 March 2017) was a Peruvian footballer. He competed in the 1959 South American Championship (Argentina) and men's tournament at the 1960 Summer Olympics.

References

External links

1939 births
2017 deaths
Peruvian footballers
Peru international footballers
Olympic footballers of Peru
Footballers at the 1960 Summer Olympics
Footballers from Lima
Association football midfielders
Sport Victoria players
Sporting Cristal footballers
Sport Boys footballers